Deh-e Jalil (also Romanized as Deh-e Jalīl; also known as Jalīl) is a village in Babuyi Rural District, Basht District, Basht County, Kohgiluyeh and Boyer-Ahmad Province, Iran. At the 2006 census, its population was 30, in 5 families.

References 

Populated places in Basht County